Manel Chinthamani Wanaguru (born 18 October 1951), is an actress in Sri Lankan cinema, theater and television.

Personal life
Manel Wanaguru was born on 18 October 1951. Her father Dudley Samuel Wanaguru was also an actor in Sinhala cinema. Dudley was born on 16 December 1922 and died on 29 July, 2003. He was a past pupil of St. Joseph's College, Wattala. He made his debut acting through film Eda Ra and then acted in many films such as Daiwa Wipakaya, Hadisi Vivahaya, Gehenu Geta and Patachara. He also directed the film Sengawunu Menika. Her mother was Indrani Dissanayake, who was a housewife. Manel has six siblings: Upendra, Lakshman, Tissa, Nihal, Tamara and Rohan.

Wanaguru is married to Ananda Wickramage, who is also a renowned actor and comedian. The couple has two sons - Janith Wickramage  and Sanketh Wickramage, both are actors.

Acting career

Selected television serials

 Akuru Maki Na
 Anne
 Bath Amma
 Bindunu Sith
 Dedunnai Adare
 Dedunnen Eha
 Gimhana Tharanaya 
 Girikula
 Hada Pudasuna 
 Hoduwawa
 Kadulu Thahanchiya
 Kammiththa
 Kokila Ginna
 Maruk Mal
 Medagedara
 Mila
 Nadeeladiya 
 Nisala Diya Sasala Viya
Nonawaruni Mahathwaruni
 Patalawilla
 Paata Veeduru
 Pawani
 Pem Piyawara
 Pooja
 Prema Parami 
 Rangamadala Samugani
 Rashmi
 Ruwan Sakmana
 Sahas Gaw Dura
 Salsapuna
 Sanda Nodutu Sanda
 Sanda Numba Nam
 Sasara Sarani
 Shaun
 Sihina Kumari
 Sihina Puraya
 Sivusiya Gawwa
 Urumaya Soya
Visirunu Renu

Selected stage dramas

 Raja Kapilla
 Stella Setwela
 Su Saha Guru

Filmography
Her maiden cinematic experience came through 1958 film Vanaliya directed by B.A.W. Jayamanne.

Awards

Deepashika Awards

|-
|| 1974 ||| Kasthuri Suwanda || Best Dramatic Performance  ||

Deepashika Awards

|-
|| 2021 ||| Contribution to Cinema || U.W. Sumathipala Lifetime||

References

External links
 
 Special screening of ‘Hima Tharaka’ in Italy
 Sound of diversity
 Rodney returns with ‘Snowy stars’

Living people
Sri Lankan film actresses
1951 births